get me there is an electronic ticketing scheme under development by Transport for Greater Manchester (TfGM) for use on public transport services in Greater Manchester, England. It was first announced and confirmed as an integrated travel card, comparable to London's Oyster card, for Greater Manchester in June 2012, following a bid from the Greater Manchester Combined Authority.

History
Get me there is based upon trials of the Bolton Citizen Card smartcard that was issued to residents of the Metropolitan Borough of Bolton in 2007 as a pilot. It is valid on travel modes across Greater Manchester including buses, Metrolink and most National Rail services within the jurisdiction of TfGM.

Use
People in Greater Manchester with existing concessionary travel passes were invited to test the scheme. Now, all concessionary pass holders are asked to start touching in and out when traveling using Metrolink. Season ticket holders were the first to be offered their own 'my get me there' card, and now all others can sign up for a card. Customers can use contactless credit/debit card with readers for simple journeys on Get Me There. However, they will not be able to store season tickets or take advantage of automatic cheapest fare functionality available to smart card users.

The name get me there was revealed on 17 June 2013, with the scheme's dedicated travel card named my get me there.

Timescale
GMT was planned to be introduced on Metrolink services from 2014, Greater Manchester bus services from 2015, and was hoped to be introduced on National Rail services across Greater Manchester from 2017, when the new Northern rail franchise was confirmed. However, the scheme's introduction on Metrolink stalled after the first stage, as it became clear that Atos, who were contracted to deliver and operate the scheme, would not be able to manage the rollout on to trams. The contract was cancelled in August 2015, with significant contractual payments made to TfGM. Plans for introducing mobile phone-based ticketing on trams before the end of the year were announced in September 2015 along with continuing rollout of the GMT card on buses via System One, the Northern and TransPennine Express rail franchises remain contractually obliged to roll out smart card use on trains as part of their franchise requirements and the northern PTEs as Rail North are doing preparatory work on a region wide smartcard.

Reception 
The GMT system has been criticised in the press as confusing and less flexible than London's Oyster card. Particular points of criticism include the requirement to buy Metrolink tickets for specific times, a long delay between purchasing a ticket online and the ticket becoming usable, and a lack of clarity regarding the distinction between the smartcard and the accompanying app, which are two independent systems.

References

External links
Official website of get me there

Transport in Greater Manchester
Contactless smart cards
Fare collection systems in the United Kingdom